Fessard is a surname. Notable people with the surname include:

Denise Albe-Fessard (1916–2003), French neuroscientist
Étienne Fessard (1714-1774), French engraver
Gaston Fessard (1897–1978), French Jesuit theologian
Jean-Marc Fessard (born 1969), French classical clarinetist